Émeraude VE121 (French for "emerald") was a large French sounding rocket of the 1960s. It built on the experiences of the Véronique and Vesta programs, and though it was only used for one year, it tested important technologies that were used in later French launch vehicles, from the Topaze and Saphir sounding rockets to the Diamant, the multi-stage orbital rocket that was used to launch France's first satellite, the Asterix-1. Emeraude was launched exclusively from the Centre interarmées d'essais d'engins spéciaux (CIEES) launch site in Hammaguir, Algeria. Its codename, VE121, means Vehicle Experimental; 1 stage, liquid propellant (code 2), guided (code 1).

The rocket was liquid-fueled and carried 12.8 tonnes of fuel and oxidizer—nitric acid and gasoline turpentine—which were pressure-fed into the four Vexin-B engines, providing a total of 301.55 kN of thrust. Pitch and yaw control were provided by gimbaling the four engines while roll control was provided by aerodynamic fins. The rocket could carry a  payload to an altitude of 200 km.

Emeraude was considered part of the "pierres précieuses" ("precious stones") rocket family, the family of sounding rockets that led up to the Diamant orbital rocket. The first launches of Emeraude – on June 15, June 17, and October 20, 1964 – were failures, casting doubt on the entire pierres précieuses program. These three launches had failed because of propellant sloshing due to pogo oscillation, a problem that was fixed before the fourth launch. However, the final two launches – on February 27 and May 13, 1965 – went well, with the latter flight reaching an altitude of 180 km. The final test carried a dummy Topaze stage for testing the aerodynamics of Emeraude's successor, the Saphir.

References

Space launch vehicles of France
Sounding rockets of France